Humberto Fuenzalida Villegas (1904–1966) was a Chilean geologist, paleontologist and geographer. Fuenzalida headed in turn the geography and geology departments of the University of Chile, being also founder of Sociedad Geológica de Chile, a professional society grouping Chile's geologists. In 1938 he took charge of the geological and paleontological collection of Chilean National Museum of Natural History by request of Ricardo E. Latcham. In 1948 he became director of the museum holding that post until 1964 when he was succeeded by Grete Mostny. Fuenzalida championed the establishment of a geology degree in the University of Chile, leading a successful effort in 1961.

In the 1926–1930 period Fuenzalida studied in Sorbonne, Paris with teachers such as Emmanuel de Martonne, Émile Haug and León Lyteaud. He died in 1966 after a long period of illness.

Career as scientist
The work of Fuenzalida spanned the whole Chilean territory, studying the geology around Puelo River, the volcanoes of Maule Region (Quizapu, Descabezado Grande, Descabezado Chico), Arauco Basin, Magallanes Basin, plus the South Shetland Islands in Chilean Antarctica.

In addition he did some confidential work for ENAP and a work on the borders between the Atlantic and Pacific oceans for the Ministry of Foreign Affairs at a time the Beagle conflict was latent.

Subjects he dealt with include sea-level change, the Andean orogeny (within a Geosynclinal theory framework), volcanism in Chile and Antarctica, sand dunes, economic geography, and reflections on figures such as Juan Ignacio Molina, Claudio Gay, Diego Barros Arana and Ricardo E. Latcham.

Physical geography and climatology were Fuenzalida's research interests of choice.

References

1904 births
1966 deaths
Chilean geographers
20th-century Chilean geologists
Chilean paleontologists
Chilean climatologists
Chilean volcanologists
People from Curicó
University of Chile alumni
Academic staff of the University of Chile
Employees of the Chilean National Museum of Natural History
20th-century geographers